The 2015–16 West Virginia Mountaineers men's basketball team represented West Virginia University during the 2015–16 NCAA Division I men's basketball season. The Mountaineers were coached by ninth year head coach Bob Huggins and played their home games at WVU Coliseum. They were members of the Big 12 Conference. They finished the season 26–9, 13–5 in Big 12 play to finish in second place. They defeated TCU and Oklahoma to advance to the championship game of the Big 12 tournament where they lost to Kansas. They received an at-large bid to the NCAA tournament where, as a #3 seed, they were upset in the first round by #14 seed Stephen F. Austin.

Previous season
The Mountaineers  finished the season 25–10, 11–7 in Big 12 play to finish in a tie for fourth place. They lost in the quarterfinals of the Big 12 tournament to Baylor. They received an at-large bid to the NCAA tournament where they defeated Buffalo in the second round and Maryland in the third round before losing in the Sweet Sixteen to Kentucky.

Departures

Incoming transfers

Recruits

Recruit Class of 2016

Roster

Schedule and results
Sources:  and 

|-
!colspan=9 style="background:#FFC600; color:#003366;"| Exhibition

|-
!colspan=9 style="background:#FFC600; color:#003366;"| Regular season

|-
!colspan=9 style="background:#FFC600; color:#003366;"| Big 12 tournament

|-
!colspan=9 style="background:#FFC600; color:#003366;"| NCAA tournament

Rankings

*AP does not release post-NCAA tournament rankings

See also
 2015–16 West Virginia Mountaineers women's basketball team

References

West Virginia
West Virginia Mountaineers men's basketball seasons
West Virginia Mountaineers men's bask
West Virginia Mountaineers men's bask
West Virginia